Hawaiian Sea Breeze may refer to:

 "Hawaiian Sea Breeze", a song written by Skeets Mcdonald
 Bay Breeze or Hawaiian Sea Breeze, a cocktail made from vodka, cranberry juice, and pineapple juice